An outdoor 1908 sculpture of Alexander Hamilton by William Ordway Partridge is installed outside Hamilton Hall on the Columbia University campus in Manhattan, New York, United States.

See also

 1908 in art

References

External links
 

1908 establishments in New York City
1908 sculptures
Columbia University campus
Statues of Alexander Hamilton
Monuments and memorials in Manhattan
Outdoor sculptures in Manhattan
Sculptures of men in New York City
Statues in New York City